Patti is a town and a Nagar Panchayat  in Pratapgarh district in the Indian state of Uttar Pradesh.

Geography
It has an average elevation of 84 metres (275 feet).

Demographics
Patti is a Nagar Panchayat city in district of Pratapgarh, Uttar Pradesh. The Patti city is divided into 10 wards for which elections are held every 5 years. The Patti Nagar Panchayat has population of 10,788 of which 5,607 are males while 5,181 are females as per report released by Census India 2011.

Population of Children with age of 0-6 is 1462 which is 13.55% of total population of Patti (NP). In Patti Nagar Panchayat, Female Sex Ratio is of 924 against state average of 912. Moreover Child Sex Ratio in Patti is around 889 compared to Uttar Pradesh state average of 902. Literacy rate of Patti city is 81.41% higher than state average of 67.68%. In Patti, Male literacy is around 87.27% while female literacy rate is 75.09%.

Patti Nagar Panchayat has total administration over 1,576 houses to which it supplies basic amenities like water and sewerage. It is also authorized to build roads within Nagar Panchayat limits and impose taxes on properties coming under its jurisdiction.

References

Cities and towns in Pratapgarh district, Uttar Pradesh